Best Selling Secrets (Traditional Chinese: 同事三分親) is a TVB modern sitcom series broadcast from March 2007 to August 2008.

The sitcom is about office politics in an advertisement company, as well as family and romantic relationships amongst the characters.

Synopsis
Wong Ka-Nam (Esther Kwan) disappeared to the United States, leaving behind her son and husband in Hong Kong.  When her husband dies in an airplane accident looking for her, Wong Ka-Nam's son, Luk Chit (Vin Choi) is taken into the custody of her mother-in-law, Ng Hang (Elaine Jin).  After eighteen long years, Wong Ka-Nam wishes to see her son again and returns to Hong Kong.  However, she is met with adamant resistance from her mother-in-law, who views Ka-Nam as bad luck, blaming her for the death of her son.  Highly protective of her grandson and fearing that Wong Ka-Nam will attempt to take him away, Ka Nam's mother-in-law does everything in her power to keep mother and son apart.

However Wong Ka-Nam is ironically assisted by her own son, who befriends her and secures her office job in his advertising agency. Most of story involves comedic and complex dynamics of office and family politics between rivals, friendship and romance within the office and household, while in the midst of Wong Ka-Nam watching over her son.

Cast

Main cast

Guest starring

Other cast

Product placements
 Best Selling Secrets was one of the first TVB series that featured placement of products, namely Sony Ericsson mobile phones, which were written into the plot for a few episodes.
 IBM T2x ThinkPad laptop computers were also featured as mobile workstations of choice for the characters.

Award nominations
40th TVB Anniversary Awards (2007)
 "Best Drama"
 "Best Actor in a Supporting Role" (Tsui Wing - Tony Kau Chun)
 "Best Actor in a Supporting Role" (Wong Cho Lam - Lau Wah)
 "Best Actor in a Supporting Role" (Stephen Au - David Mo Gei-Yung)
 "Best Actress in a Supporting Role" (Yoyo Chen - Kawaii Ho Tung-Tung)
 "My Favourite Male Character Role" (Stephen Au - David Mo Gei-Yung)
 "My Favourite Male Character Role" (Geoffrey wong - Yin Wai Sun)
 "My Favourite Female Character Role" (Esther Kwan - Wong Ka-Nam)
 "My Favourite Female Character Role" (Elaine Jin - Ng Han)
 "My Favourite Female Character Role" (Elvina Kong - Diana Dai On-Na)
41st TVB Anniversary Awards (2008)
 "Best Drama"
 "Best Actor in a Supporting Role" (Tsui Wing - Tony Kau Chun)
 "Best Actor in a Supporting Role" (Stephen Au - David Mo Gei-Yung)

See also
Off Pedder

External links
TVB.com Best Selling Secrets - Official Website 
Esther Kwan's Realm Blog Best Selling Secrets - Episode Summaries, Articles, Screen Captures, and Scans

TVB dramas
2007 Hong Kong television series debuts
2008 Hong Kong television series endings